The PSA World Tour Finals is the end of season championship of the PSA World Tour of male and female professional squash players. The top eight players in the current PSA World Tour is qualified for the event.

The eight players compete in two groups of four and play a round robin  to determine the semi-finalists. The competition then becomes a knock-out competition to determine the World Series Finals champions. The event has been staged since 1993 in Zurich, Hatfield, London and Manchester and then London again before switching to Dubai in 2016. The event has prize money of $160,000.  In 2012 the event added a women's section 2011 and 2013 has seen the women compete again during the day session, with the men competing in the evening session. The first edition of the women's competition was won by Nicol David.

Before the 2018–19 PSA World Tour season, it was named PSA World Series Finals.

Venues

Results

Men's

Women's

References

External links
 Official website
 Page at PSA World Tour